During the 290s BC, Hellenistic civilization begins its emergence throughout the successor states of the former Argead Macedonian Empire of Alexander the Great, resulting in the diffusion of Greek culture throughout the Levant and advances in science, mathematics, philosophy, etc. Meanwhile, the Roman Republic is embroiled in war against the Samnites, the Mauryan Empire continues to thrive in Ancient India, and the Kingdom of Qin in Ancient China, the one which in the future will conquer its adversaries and unite China, begins to emerge as a significant power during the Warring States period.

Significant people
 Nan, Zhou dynasty king of China, r. 314–256 BC
 Mencius, Chinese Confucian philosopher
 Perunar killi, King of the Chola Empire, r. 316-286 BC
 Huai, King of Chu, r. 328–299 BC
 Qingxiang, King of Chu, r. 299–263 BC
 Qu Yuan, poet, scholar, and minister from Chu
 Ptolemy I, Pharaoh of Egypt, r. 305–285 BC
 Euclid of Alexandria, mathematician and "Father of Geometry"
 Onias I High-Priest of Israel, held position 320–280 BC
 Neoptolemus II, King of Epirus, r. 302–297 BC
 Pyrrhus I, King of Epirus, r. 307–302, 297–272 BC
 Pharnavaz I, King of Caucasian Iberia r. 302-237
 Énna Aignech, Legendary High-King of Ireland, r. 313-293 BC
 Crimthann Coscrach, Legendary High-King of Ireland, r. 293-289 BC
 Kōan, Legendary Emperor of Japan, r. 392–291 BC
 Kōrei, Legendary Emperor of Japan, r. 291–215 BC
 Aktisanes, King of Kush, r. c. 300-290 BC
 Cassander, King of Macedon, r. 305–297 BC
 Philip IV, King of Macedon, r. 297 BC
 Alexander V and Antipater II, co-kings of Macedon r. 297–294 BC
 Demetrius I, King of Macedon, r. 294–288 BC
 Epicurus, Greek philosopher (founder of Epicureanism)
 Chandragupta Maurya, Mauryan dynasty Emperor of India, r. 322–298 BC
 Bindusara, Mauryan dynasty Emperor of India, r. 298–272 BC
 Chanakya, Mauryan Prime Minister
 Zhaoxiang, King of Qin, r. 307–251 BC
 Bai Qi, Qin general
 Lucius Cornelius Scipio Barbatus, Roman Consul and general, in office 298 BC 
 Publius Decius Mus, Roman Consul, in office 312, 308, 297, 295 BC
 Fabius Maximus Rullianus, Roman Consul and general, in office 322, 315, 310, 308, 297, 295 BC
 Lucius Volumnius Flamma Violens, Roman Consul and general, in office 307, 296 BC
 Appius Claudius Caecus, Roman Consul and Censor, in office 312-308, 307, 296, 285 BC
 Lucius Postumius Megellus, in office 305, 294, 291 BC
 Spurius Carvilius Maximus, Roman Consul, in office 293, 272 BC
 Lucius Papirius Cursor, Roman Consul, in office 293, 272 BC
 Manius Curius Dentatus, Roman Consul and general, in office 290, 284, 275, 274 BC
 Gellius Egnatius, Samnite general during the Third Samnite War
 Gavius Pontius, Samnite general during the Second and Third Samnite Wars
 Seleucus I, King of the Seleucid Empire, r. 305–281 BC
 Antiochus, Prince, commander of western territories, and future king of the Seleucid Empire
 Berossus of Babylon, astronomer and writer
 Megasthenes, traveller, geographer, and Seleucid ambassador to the Mauryan Empire
 Areus I (Agaid king) r. 309–265 and Archidamus IV (Eurypontid king) r. 305–275 BC, Co-kings of Sparta
 Agathocles, Tyrant of Syracuse, in office 317–289 BC
 Lysimachus, King of Thrace and Asia Minor, r. 306-281 BC (Thrace), 301-281 BC (Asia Minor)
 Cotys II, King of Odrysian Thrace, r. 300-280 BC
 Wuling, King of Zhao, r. 326–299 BC
 Huiwen, King of Zhao, r. 299–266 BC

References